Urostylida is an order of littoral ciliates. The taxonomy of the order is largely unresolved and still subject to scientific inquiry.

Families 
According to the Catalogue of Life, nine families are accepted within Holosticha.

 Bakuellidae
 Holostichidae
 Kahliellidae
 Pseudokeronopsidae
 Pseudourostylidae
 Psilotrichidae
 Rigidothrichidae
 Trachelostylidae
 Urostylidae

References 

Hypotrichea
Eukaryote orders
Taxa described in 1979